Zebu Nation is Razia Said's first album on the U.S. based label, Cumbancha.  On the disc Razia "sings about the destruction of the natural world on her island nation. Extreme poverty has made slash and burn agriculture one of the only means of supporting a family."  Razia Said a native of Madagascar engages the Malagasy style she grew up with, while blending the Jazz and R&B sounds she became familiar with while living in New York City.  Razia recorded the album, as her way, of fighting for the environment and her home land; the album's mission is to "raise consciousness worldwide about global warming, specifically the devastation it’s brought to her native land. The zebu of the album title – a member of the cattle family – is only one of thousands of species in Madagascar who are in danger of extinction."  Zebu Nation is a multi-functional album.

Track listing

Notes

Further reading
Choix
National Pride
Passport:Razia

2010 albums